The Maglalatik (also known as Manlalatik or Magbabao) is a folk dance from the Philippines performed by male dancers. Coconut shell halves are secured onto the dancers' hands and on vests upon which are hung four or six more coconut shell halves. The dancers perform the dance by hitting one coconut shell with the other; sometimes the ones on the hands, the ones on the body, or the shells worn by another performer, all in time to a fast drumbeat.

Maglalatik can be seen as a mock battle between the dancing boys. The dance is intended to impress the viewer with the great skill of the dancer. In some "Filipino Martial Arts" (FMA) circles, it is noted that the Maglalatik "consists of a trapping and boxing method hidden in a dance."

The name of the dance means "latik-maker", from latik, a coconut product that is used in Filipino cooking. The dance is also a war dance depicting a fight between Moros and Christians over the latik.

References

See also
Music of the Philippines
Cariñosa
Tinikling

Dances of the Philippines
Culture of Laguna (province)

ta:ரினிக்லிங்